Meenakshi Shirodkar (11 October 1916 – 3 June 1997), born Ratan Pednekar, was an Indian actress who mainly worked in Marathi films, Marathi theatre and television. She made her debut in 1938 and continued to act in films until the early 1970s. Her appearance in a swimsuit in the Marathi film Brahmachari (1938) with Master Vinayak stunned the traditional audience. She is a grandmother of two Bollywood actresses, Namrata Shirodkar and Shilpa Shirodkar.

Personal life 
Shirodkar was born Ratan Pednekar on 11 October 1916 to a Maharashtrian family. She started learning Indian classical music at an early age. In 1936, she married Dr. Shirodkar, with whom she had a son, who married Marathi actress Gangu Bai and had the Bollywood actresses Namrata Shirodkar and Shilpa Shirodkar, who also worked in the film industry. Namrata was crowned as Miss India in 1993 and is married to Tollywood actor, Mahesh Babu and has two children. On 4 June 1997, Shirodkar died at the age of 80 in Mumbai.

Career 
In 1935, Shirodkar joined All India Radio (AIR) where she worked in radio dramas. After her marriage in 1936, she got a film offer from Pandurang Naik, one of the partners in a film company called Hans Pictures. Though Shirodkar declined the offer in the beginning, Naik convinced Shirodkar's husband that she should make a film debut.

Shirodkar debuted with a 1938 Marathi film Brahmachari, opposite Master Vinayak. The writer of the film Pralhad Keshav Atre, better known as "Āchārya Atre", changed her name from "Ratan" to "Meenaxi" to suit her big eyes. She created a stir by appearing in a swimsuit in the song "Yamuna Jali Khelu Khel" in the film and stunned the traditional audience. She rose to fame for her then daring act, and for her twin-plait hairstyle in the song, but also got criticized heavily. The song was sung by Shirodkar herself and became a hit. It was also reused in the play by the same name, and years later in other films as well. She continued to do several other films with Master Vinayak such as Brandichi Batli (1939), Ghar Ki Rani (1940), Amrut (1941) and Majhe Bal (1943).

After retiring from major roles in 1950, Shirodkar played a few minor roles in films and joined Marathi theatre with "Nutan Sangeet Natak Mandali". During the period 1950-75, she worked in twelve Sangeet Nataks (musical plays) including Mruchhakatik, Maanaapmaan, Ekach Pyaala and others.

Films

Theater

References

External links 
 

Marathi actors
People from Maharashtra
1916 births
Place of birth missing
1997 deaths
Actresses in Marathi cinema
Actresses in Marathi theatre
Actresses in Hindi cinema
20th-century Indian actresses